Splende is the fourth solo studio album of the Italian singer-songwriter Annalisa, published on February 12, 2015 by label Warner Music Italy.

Receptions 

Splende debuted at the 7th position of the FIMI Albums Chart, also remained top 10 in the next two weeks.

Track listing

Credits and personnel 
 Annalisa - lead vocals, backing vocals
 Enrico Palmosi - piano, programming
 Claudio Dirani - drums
 Andrea Benassai - guitar, programming
 Diego Calvetti - piano, synthesizer, programming
 Giorgio Secco - acoustic guitar
 Rossano Eleuteri - bass guitar
 Diego Arrigoni - electric guitar
 Nicola Oliva - acoustic guitar
 Emiliano Bassi - drums
 Stefano Forcella - bass guitar
 Enrico Zapparoli - acoustic guitar
 Donald Renda - drums
 Paolo Petrini - electric guitar
 Concertmaster - Angela Savi, Angela Tomei, Maria Costanza Costantino
 Violin - Natalia Kuleshova, Roberta Malavolti, Teona Kazishvili
 Viola - Sabrina Giuliani, Valentina Rebaudengo
 Cello - Elisabetta Sciotti, Laura Gorkoff

Charts

References

2015 albums
Annalisa albums